Television in Haiti includes several stations including Christian live streaming channels.

TV Stations

See also
 Media of Haiti

References

External links
  Muska Group: French & Haitian Creole Advertisements (Film & Radio)